Besifovir (INN) is an investigational medication to treat hepatitis B virus (HBV) infection.
It is a novel and potent acyclic nucleotide phosphonate with a similar chemical structure to adefovir and tenofovir.

References

Antiviral drugs
Phosphonic acids
Purines
Cyclopropanes